Fai Amata is a Thai drama television series. It aired on Saturday and Sunday nights on Channel 9 MCOT starting 10 Apr, 2010, starring Shahkrit Yamnam, Sonia Couling Vacharasinthu, Nirut Sirijanya and Uthumphon Silaphan.

The series is adapted from the autobiography Be a Better Man by Vikrom Kromadit, developed by Sanlaya, produced by JSL Global Media co., Ltd and Amata Foundation.

Cast

Main Cast 
 Shahkrit Yamnam as Athit
 Sonia Couling Vacharasinthu as Kelly Yao
 Nirut Sirijanya as Thungfat; Athit's father
 Uthumphon Silaphan as Chia; Athit's mother

Supporting Cast 

 Somphop Benchathikun as Yao Papa; Kelly's father
 Dueantem Salitun as Yao Mama; Kelly's mother
 Phitsamai Wilaisak as Grandmom
 Saat Piamphongsan as Granddad
 Chalao Prasopsat as Grandmom
 Rong Khaomunkhadi as Uncle Yin
 Nat Phuwanai as Uncle Sen
 Daran Boonyasak as Nari; Athit's lover
 Sarocha Wathittaphan as India; Athit's sister
 Suphot Chancharoen as Ting; Athit's brother
 Athaphon Thimakon as Lan; Athit's brother
 Chalisa Bunkhrongtrap as Wiphawi
 Tin Chokkamonkit as Wibun; Athit's brother
 Chakrit Chatuphonwatthanaphon as Wiwat
 Chutima Thangsri as Nora
 Jamie Bouher as Somhathai
 Thanaphat Thitiphalathip as Fuk
 Naowarat Suesat as Benchamat 
 Saithan Miyomkan as Siam
 Chanana Nutakom as Rattana
 Ranya Siyanon as Aet; Thungfat's second wife
 Wasitthi Srilofung as Ku
 Narin Na Bangchang as Hiang
 Kuensit Suwanwatthi as Tunyoen
 Thanom Samthon as Chenlei
 Haek Chuanchuen as Yom
 Wanwisa Damkham as Rabiap
 Phiphat Witthayapanyanon as Chittakon; Athit's best friend
 Sariya Atsawaloetphanit as Da Yi; Kelly's best friend
 Chonnasorn Sajakul as Kaiwei Yao; Kelly's sister
 Phuchisa Suphathanaphat as Piak
 Panwet Saiklai as Tai

Awards

Trivia 
 Based on true story of the book Be a Better Man, the autobiography of Vikrom Kromadit, a Thai businessman and writer. He is the founder and chief executive officer of Amata Corporation PCL. The book has sold over 1.6 million copies in Thailand, and is being translated into different languages.
 Athit is form Vikrom Kromadit and Kelly Yao is form Kelly Yao, his first wife.
 This is the second time Shahkrit Yamnam and Sonia Couling have worked together.
 The first Thai television series of Sorn CLC
filmed at "Bopiliao Historical District" in Taipei, National Taiwan University, Yangming Mountain, Tamsui, Chien Mu's residence, Hsinchu High School, among others.

References

External links 
 Fai Amata on Official site 

Thai romance television series
2010s Thai television series
2010 Thai television series debuts
2010 Thai television series endings
Thai drama television series
MCOT HD original programming